Going public may refer to:
Initial public offering, financial action by a business
Whistleblowing, exposure of previously private information
 Going Public (Newsboys album), 1994
 Going Public (Bruce Johnston album), 1977